The University of Mons-Hainaut (UMH), in Mons, Wallonia, Belgium, was a university in the French Community of Belgium. Its official language was French. 

From January 1, 2009, the University of Mons-Hainaut and the Engineering Faculty of Mons Faculté polytechnique de Mons fused in a new university simply called the University of Mons.

History
The University of Mons-Hainaut was established in 1965 from the Institut commercial des industriels du Hainaut, which had been founded in 1899 by Raoul Warocqué. In the university library, which was established in 1797, there were more than 715,000 items, including 450 manuscripts, one of which was from the 10th century, and 140 incunables, of which one was a Gutenberg Bible.

Notable alumni
 Elio Di Rupo, chemist, politician, and former prime minister of Belgium.

See also

 Science and technology in Wallonia
 Initialis Science Park

References

Sources
 Université de Mons-Hainaut

Universite de Mons-Hainaut
University of Mons
Educational institutions established in 1965
Educational institutions disestablished in 2008
1965 establishments in Belgium